Conversations on Serious Topics is a 2012 Lithuanian documentary film directed by Giedrė Beinoriūtė. The film was selected as the Lithuanian entry for the Best Foreign Language Film at the 86th Academy Awards, but it was not nominated.

See also
 List of submissions to the 86th Academy Awards for Best Foreign Language Film
 List of Lithuanian submissions for the Academy Award for Best Foreign Language Film

References

External links
 

2012 films
2012 documentary films
Lithuanian documentary films
Lithuanian-language films